Ahmadabad-e Shahrak (also Romanized as Aḩmadābād-e Shahrak and Aḩmadābād Shahrak; also known as Shabrak, Shahrak-e Aḩmadābād, Shahrak-e Bālā, Shahrak-e Kohneh, and Verkhnyaya Shayryay) is a village in Bedevostan-e Gharbi Rural District, Khvajeh District, Heris County, East Azerbaijan Province, Iran. At the 2006 census, its population was 147, in 40 families.

References 

Populated places in Heris County